Duck Patrol was a short-lived British television comedy series that originally aired in 1998. Produced by LWT for the ITV network, it centred on a river police station by the River Thames.  The series consisted of seven episodes: Flying Colours, Out to Grass, Occurrences, The Spirit of the Deep, Duck Turpin, River Rage, The Siege of Mallory Wharf.

The script for the pilot episode 'Of Ducks and Men' was re-filmed with some changes to supporting cast and main cast uniforms, and retitled as 'Flying Colours' which then became the first episode of the following series.

Cast
Richard Wilson as PC Roland "Prof" Rose
David Tennant as Simon "Darwin" Brown 
Samantha Beckinsale as Gillian "Marilyn" Monroe
Trevor Cooper as James "Ollie" Oliver
Geoffrey Hutchings as Malcolm "Sarge" White 
Jason Watkins as Kevin "Taz" Delaney
Craig Fairbrass as Hero 
Sue Johnston as Val Rutland 
John Biggins as Stan Murdoch 
Jan Ravens as Angie Tennant

Episodes

Series 1 (1998)
Filming for this series began in July 1998 and ended in August 1998.

External links

ITV sitcoms
1998 British television series debuts
1998 British television series endings
1990s British sitcoms
Television series by ITV Studios
London Weekend Television shows
English-language television shows